The acronym UNIGE or UniGe could refer to:
 Université de Genève, located in Geneva, Switzerland
 Università di Genova, located in Genoa, Italy, EU

Geneva
Genoa